Amin ur Rashid Yasin is a Bangladesh Nationalist Party politician and a Member of Parliament from Comilla-9.

Career
Yasin was elected to parliament from Comilla-9 as an Bangladesh Nationalist Party candidate in February 1996.

References

Bangladesh Nationalist Party politicians
Date of birth missing (living people)
6th Jatiya Sangsad members